The Street may refer to:

Geographical
Wall Street in New York City's Financial District
The Street, Lawshall, Suffolk, England
The Street (Heath Charnock), a building and bridleway in Rivington, Lancashire, England

Film and television
The Street (UK TV series), a drama shown on BBC One in 2006, 2007 and 2009
The Street (2000 TV series), an American television drama series
The Street: A Film with the Homeless, a 1997 documentary about the Canadian homeless in Montreal
The Street (1988 TV series), an American police drama
The Street (1923 film), a German silent drama film
The Street (1949 film), as Swedish drama film
The Street (1958 film), a German crime drama film
The Street (1976 film), an Oscar-nominated animated short film by Caroline Leaf, adapted from the Mordechai Richler story
The Street (2019 film), a documentary about gentrification in London

Literature
"The Street" (short story), by H. P. Lovecraft
The Street (novel), a 1946 novel by Ann Petry
The Street (story collection), a 1969 short story collection by Mordecai Richler

Painting
The Street, 1888 painting by Vincent van Gogh

Website
TheStreet.com, an American financial news and services website

See also
 The Streets (aka Michael Geoffery Skinner, born 1978), a rapper from Birmingham, England
 La Rue (disambiguation), an equivalent disambiguation page with French wording
 La Strada, equivalent disambiguation page with Italian wording